Flower Films is an American production company owned by Drew Barrymore and Nancy Juvonen.

Filmography

Film
 Never Been Kissed (1999)
 Charlie's Angels (2000)
 Donnie Darko (2001)
 Duplex (2003)
 Charlie's Angels: Full Throttle (2003)
 50 First Dates (2004)
 Fever Pitch (2005)
 Music and Lyrics (2007)
 He's Just Not That Into You (2009)
 Whip It! (2009)
 Happy Camp (2014)
 Animal (2014)
 How to Be Single (2016)
 Freak Show (2018)
 Charlie's Angels (2019)
 The Stand In (2020)

Television
 Olive, the Other Reindeer (1999)
 Choose or Lose Presents: The Best Place to Start (2004)
 Tough Love Couples (2010)
 Charlie's Angels (2011)
 Knife Fight (2013)
 Santa Clarita Diet (2017)
 Princess Power (2023)
 The Drew Barrymore Show (2020–present)

References

Film production companies of the United States
Entertainment companies established in 1995
Drew Barrymore